The 1983 Memphis State Tigers football team represented Memphis State University (now known as the University of Memphis) as an independent during the 1983 NCAA Division I-A football season. In its third and final season under head coach Rex Dockery, the team compiled a 6–4–1 record and outscored opponents by a total of 274 to 205. The team played its home games at Liberty Bowl Memorial Stadium in Memphis, Tennessee. 

The team's statistical leaders included Danny Sparkman with 1,390 passing yards, Punkin Williams with 546 rushing yards, Derrick Crawford with 594 receiving yards, and Don Glosson with 71 points scored (29 extra points, 14 field goals).

Schedule

References

Memphis State
Memphis Tigers football seasons
Memphis State Tigers football